Revenge for Eddy (German:Rache für Eddy) is a 1929 German silent Western film directed by Otz Tollen.

Cast
In alphabetical order
 Sándor Bihari as Jack Dodge  
 Victor Colani as Inspektor Captain MacNelly  
 Muriel Dawson as Stift  
 Bernhard Förster as Der rote Ben  
 Carl Geppert as Sheriff von Springwood O'Brien  
 Kitty Hellens as Mary  
 Mara Markhoff as Eine Mestizin  
 Ernst Morgan as Bill Moore  
 Eddie Polo as Sergeant Eddy Webster  
 Magda Tausig as Ruth  
 Otz Tollen as Davis Smith  
 Ilse van Straaten as Janet  
 Kurt von Möllendorff as Jimmy (Landreiter)

References

Bibliography
 Kay Weniger. Lexikon der aus Deutschland und sterreich emigrierten Filmschaffenden 1933 bis 1945. ACABUS Verlag, 2011.

External links
 

1929 films
1929 Western (genre) films
Films of the Weimar Republic
German black-and-white films
Silent German Western (genre) films
1920s German films